Joseph George Tait (born 4 February 1990) is an English professional footballer who plays as a centre back for National League North club Spennymoor Town.

Career

Early career
Tait was born in Middlesbrough, Cleveland. He turned professional in 2006 with League One club Hartlepool United. He played extensively with the youth and reserve teams, captaining the youth team to the Youth League Cup final in 2007, and helping the reserves win the Division One East title of the Central League.

United States
Tait moved from his native England to the United States in 2009 after accepting a scholarship to play college soccer at Lindsey Wilson College. He was on the roster for their soccer team, the Lindsey Wilson College Blue Raiders, for the 2009 and 2010 seasons. He made 18 appearances, scoring four goals. During his college years, Tait also played in the Premier Development League for the Baton Rouge Capitals, helping his team to the PDL National Semi-finals in 2010. He also won PDL defender of the year 2010.

Tait turned professional once again in April 2011 when he signed for the Dayton Dutch Lions of the USL Pro. He made his debut on 23 April 2011 against the Rochester Rhinos. He was signed by Philadelphia Union of Major League Soccer on 13 September 2011.

England
After being released by Philadelphia, Tait signed for Darlington 1883 of the Northern Football League Division One in September 2012. He made his debut on 8 September in a 5–0 win over Consett. He scored his first goal for Darlington on 22 September in a 3–0 win at Dunston UTS. After signing for Darlington, Tait missed only one game during the season. He also scored 5 goals.

Tait signed for Conference Premier club Gateshead on 31 May 2013 on a one-year contract. He made his debut on 10 August 2013 against Kidderminster Harriers. Tait's first goal for Gateshead came on 30 November 2013 in a 4–1 win over Hednesford Town in the FA Trophy. On 10 January 2014, Tait rejoined Darlington 1883 (for financial purposes) on loan for the remainder of the 2013–14 season. The following day, Tait scored the opening goal on his second debut for Darlington in a 2–0 win against Harrogate Railway Athletic. At the end of the 2013–14 season, Tait was released by Gateshead.

Tait signed for Spennymoor Town on 1 July 2014. The defender would go on to play over 100 times for the Moors in his 4 year stay, scoring 31 goals, and gaining promotion from the Northern League to the National League North for the first time in the club's history in the 2016/17 season.

Following a successful trial period, Tait signed for National League North club York City on 26 July 2018.

In September of 2020, Tait returned to Brewery Field for a second spell with Spennymoor, to once again work under the leadership of Jason Ainsley.

Career statistics

Honours
Darlington 1883
Northern Football League Division One: 2012–13

Individual
Premier Development League Defender of the Year: 2010

References

External links

Profile  at the York City F.C. profile

1990 births
Living people
Footballers from Middlesbrough
English footballers
Association football defenders
Hartlepool United F.C. players
Baton Rouge Capitals players
Dayton Dutch Lions players
Philadelphia Union players
Darlington F.C. players
Gateshead F.C. players
Spennymoor Town F.C. players
York City F.C. players
USL League Two players
USL Championship players
Northern Football League players
National League (English football) players
Northern Premier League players
Lindsey Wilson Blue Raiders men's soccer players
English expatriate footballers
Expatriate soccer players in the United States
English expatriate sportspeople in the United States